Callionymus hildae, Hilde's darter dragonet, is a species of dragonet endemic to the Pacific waters around the Philippines. The specific name honours Miss Hildegard Handermann, of Braunschweig, for her "continued interest" in the author's, Ronald Fricke's, studies.

References 

H
Fish described in 1981
Taxa named by Ronald Fricke